Henrique Dias de Carvalho or simply Henrique Dias (born May 23, 1984 in São Paulo),  is a Brazilian attacking midfielder for Botafogo-SP.

Contract
16 April 2007 to 31 December 2008

External links

CBF
placar

1984 births
Living people
Brazilian footballers
Brazilian expatriate footballers
Daejeon Hana Citizen FC players
Joinville Esporte Clube players
Paraná Clube players
Expatriate footballers in South Korea
Coritiba Foot Ball Club players
Associação Desportiva São Caetano players
Mirassol Futebol Clube players
Ceará Sporting Club players
Grêmio Barueri Futebol players
Vila Nova Futebol Clube players
Botafogo Futebol Clube (SP) players
Campeonato Brasileiro Série A players
K League 1 players
Brazilian expatriate sportspeople in South Korea
Association football midfielders
Footballers from São Paulo